Oded Stark is an economist and Distinguished Fellow at the Center for Development Research, University of Bonn, Distinguished Professor at the University of Warsaw, and Adjunct Professor at the University of Tuebingen.

Biography

Over the course of his career, Oded Stark has held the Chair in Economic and Regional Policy at the University of Klagenfurt, the Chair in Development Economics at the University of Oslo, and has worked as Professor of Population and Economics as well as the Director of the Migration and Development Programme at Harvard University, as Honorary University Professor of Economics at the University of Vienna, and as Distinguished Research Scholar at Georgetown University. As of 2019, he works as Distinguished Professor at the University of Warsaw, adjunct professor at the University of Tübingen, and as Distinguished Fellow at the University of Bonn's Center for Development Research. Stark is a co-editor of the Handbook of Population and Family Economics (with Mark Rosenzweig).

Research

Oded Stark's research interests include applied microeconomic theory, development economics, population economics, the economics of migration, and labour economics. According to IDEAS/RePEc, Oded Stark ranks among the top 1% of economists in terms of research output.

Recognition
Stark has an honorary doctorate from the University of Warsaw. He is a Humboldt Fellow, has a lifetime achievement award from the Ministry of Science and Higher Education of Poland, and is a Presidential Professor of Economics in Poland.

Bibliography (selected)
 Stark, O. (1993). The Migration of Labor. Cambridge, MA: Blackwell.
 Rosenzweig, Mark R. & Stark, O., eds. Handbook of Population and Family Economics. Elsevier, 1997.
 Stark, O. (1999). Altruism and Beyond: An Economic Analysis of Transfers and Exchanges Within Families and Groups. Cambridge: Cambridge University Press.

References

External links
 Homepage of Oded Stark

Living people
Labor economists
Migration economists
Development economists
Academic staff of Bar-Ilan University
Academic staff of the University of Bonn
Harvard University faculty
Academic staff of the University of Klagenfurt
Academic staff of the University of Warsaw
Year of birth missing (living people)
21st-century Polish economists
20th-century Polish economists